Stephen Mark Merfeld (born September 23, 1961) is an American college basketball coach. He currently is the associate head men's basketball coach at Creighton University and previously served as head coach at Hampton University and the University of Evansville.

Career
After graduating from the University of Wisconsin–La Crosse, Merfeld began his coaching career with a ten-year stint as an assistant under Jim Larrañaga at Bowling Green State. He then joined the staff at Hampton, where he was promoted to head coach in 1997 after one season as an assistant coach. Merfeld coached the Hampton Pirates to back-to-back NCAA tournaments, including a first-round upset of second-seeded Iowa State in 2001. The shot of Hampton forward David Johnson lifting a jubilant Merfeld in the air in celebration after the Pirates' 2001 upset remains a memorable event in March Madness history.

After being named Mid-Major Coach of the Year by CollegeInsider.com in 2002, Merfeld departed Hampton to become the head coach at Evansville, a position he remained in until 2007.

In December 2009, he stepped down as an assistant coach at Bradley University.

Merfeld joined Greg McDermott's staff at Creighton prior to the 2010–11 season.

Head coaching record

References

1961 births
Living people
American men's basketball coaches
Basketball coaches from Wisconsin
Bowling Green Falcons men's basketball coaches
Bowling Green State University alumni 
Bradley Braves men's basketball coaches
Creighton Bluejays men's basketball coaches
Evansville Purple Aces men's basketball coaches
Hampton Pirates men's basketball coaches
High school basketball coaches in the United States
People from Grant County, Wisconsin
University of Wisconsin–La Crosse alumni